The roots of law, legal thought and education in Serbia go back to the 13th century. This is owed to Rastko Nemanjić, who was declared a saint under the name St. Sava. Rastko, the brother of the first Serbian king Stefan Nemanjić, was the founder of not only the ecclesiastical independence (autocephaly of the Serbian church in 1219), but he also has instituted the Serbian education, literature, health, the legal system and science.

At the same time when John of England released the famous Magna Carta Libertatum in Latin, in Serbia St. Sava has prepared and published in his native language a collection of both church and secular regulations under the name Nomocanon. In conjunction with the monumental lawmaking initiative of Stefan Uroš IV Dušan of Serbia in 1349, the Dušan's Code, which was written in Serbian as well, these acts constitute the foundation of the Serbian legal culture. Even during the long-lasting rule of the Turks, which began in the mid-15th century, Serbian law has survived through the practice of the Serbian Orthodox Church, which still considers the Nomocanon its official codex. However, only liberation from the Turkish authorities, starting in the 19th century, enabled the full bloom of Serbian legal science and education.

At some stage in the struggle for national liberation from the Turks during the First Serbian Uprising that started in 1804, the Belgrade Higher School was founded in 1808. The classes lasted three years and in addition to general subjects the curriculum included comparative and state (constitutional) law, international law, criminal law and judicial procedure. Therefore, there are many historians who believe that it is justified to perceive that the foundation of modern education in Serbia was the Higher School and the year 1808. This year is taken as the date when the University of Belgrade Faculty of Law was established.

1841 – 1863

In 1841, Belgrade has become the capital city of Serbia and in the same year the Lyceum moved from Kragujevac to Belgrade. At that time, the Belgrade Lyceum had two departments - Law and Philosophy. Before enrolling the Legal Department (which initially lasted one year, from 1843 two years, and since 1849 three years), it was compulsory to graduate at the Philosophy Department, where the studies lasted two years, so the legal studies lasted a total of five years. The classes were in the native Serbian language, and the first professors were educated Serbs from Vojvodina. Among them was the well-known Serbian writer, comediographer and lawyer, Jovan Sterija Popović, who held two courses: Natural Law (Encyclopedia of Law, or today's Introduction to Law) and a course on the organization of courts and civil procedure. Since 1853, the legal education became independent from the studies of philosophy.

1863 – 1905

Subsequently, in 1863 the University of Belgrade rudiment consisted of the Philosophy, Law and Technical departments. From the Countess Ljubica's Residence, a beautiful small building in the center of Belgrade, the Higher School moved to one of the most significant buildings in Belgrade, the Captain Miša’s Mansion, bequeathed to the nation by Captain Miša Anastasijević, which is today home to the Rectorate (seat) of the University of Belgrade. Since then, legal education in Serbia lasted four years, within the framework of which 21 subjects were compulsory.

1905 – 1941

The Higher School formally became the University of Belgrade through the Law on the University from February 27, 1905. In addition to the Philosophy, Law and Technical schools, this Law has set forth the existence of Orthodox Theology and Medical schools. Given the limited space in the building of Captain Miša Anastasijević, the library of the Faculty of Law has moved to a separate building in the center of the city, and a number of its teachers received their offices at the National Library at the Kosančićev Venac. Today, the law school building, whose construction began in 1937, was completed in fall 1940, just before the Second World War. The Library of the Faculty of Law has been moved there as well. At that time, it had a collection of over 36,000 books and monographs, representing the foremost law library in the Balkans. 

The legal studies lasted four years and consisted of the 19 compulsory subjects, and for students of the Islamic confession Sharia Law was introduced as an additional subject. Regulations on law schools from 1938 have set forth a unique curriculum for all three law schools, which then existed in the Kingdom of Yugoslavia (Belgrade, Zagreb, Ljubljana). Twenty compulsory subjects were set forth, with the proviso that only at the University of Belgrade Faculty of Law, under the same conditions as before, Sharia Law was taught as an additional subject.

Since the formation of the University until the First World War several hundred students were enrolled. The first woman at the University of Belgrade Faculty of Law graduated in 1914. During the period between the two world wars, the law school experienced its full bloom, it grew out into a modern European institution for legal education and has acquired a high international reputation. Shortly before the Second World War, more than 4,000 students were enrolled (of which there were almost 1,000 female students).

At that time, Slobodan Jovanović was one of the greatest authorities on jurisprudence and especially constitutional law. Liberal in his social and political views, he was for nearly half a century a leader of the Serbian intelligentsia.

1941 – 1945

The newly constructed law school building was damaged during the April bombing of Belgrade in 1941 and all lectures and activities were suspended. The German occupation forces moved into the building. Although there were later attempts of the occupation authorities to do the restoration work, this has not occurred due to the protests and boycott of the professors and aides. In November 1941, seven teachers were imprisoned in a camp, because of their liberal attitudes and antifascist views, and two foremost Serbian authorities in legal education, Djordje Tasić and Mihajlo Ilic, were executed in 1944.

1945 to present

The building was renewed shortly after the Second World War, but the dramatic changes engendered by the Communist rule and the decades of legal, social and political experiments have left various consequences. Immediately after the war, and later due to the ideological and political dissent, the Faculty of Law lost a number of its professors and assistants. Notably, after the well-known discourse on the constitutional amendments of 1971, the state proceeded with the criminal prosecution and imprisonment of renowned Professor Mihailo Djurić. It was a similar case with many other academics.

Despite the flagrant events from the following decades, the law school rapidly developed. An entire constellation of scholars of the new generation emerged, who continued the work of their distinguished predecessors. Alexander Soloviev, Radomir Lukić and Mihailo Djurić are some of the foremost Serbian legal academics of the 20th century. Their students until today are at the forefront of the teams of experts drafting new laws, their scholarly papers are being published abroad, they are the arbitrators at international arbitration courts, members of the Serbian Academy of Sciences and Arts, members and officials of international scholarly institutions and professional organizations, honorary doctors at foreign universities, visiting professors at the world’s leading universities, and rectors of the University of Belgrade. 

During the 20th century, all the law schools that later emerged in Serbia (Subotica, Novi Sad, Priština, Niš, Kragujevac), Montenegro (Podgorica), and in other parts of the former Yugoslavia (Sarajevo, Skoplje) were formed from the University of Belgrade Faculty of Law as a core. A large number of law professors from all the countries of the former Yugoslavia had obtained their academic titles in Belgrade.

See also
 List of law schools in Serbia

Education in Belgrade
Education in Serbia
University of Belgrade Faculty of Law
Legal history of Serbia
History of education